The second South American Junior Championships in Athletics were held in Santiago, Chile from April 30-May 1, 1960.

Participation (unofficial)
Detailed result lists can be found on the "World Junior Athletics History" website.  An unofficial count yields the number of about 74 athletes from about 3 countries:  Argentina (25), Chile (30), Peru (19).

Medal summary
Medal winners are published for men and women
Complete results can be found on the "World Junior Athletics History" website.

Men

Medal table (unofficial)

References

External links
World Junior Athletics History

South American U20 Championships in Athletics
1960 in Chilean sport
South American U20 Championships
International athletics competitions hosted by Chile
1960 in youth sport